The Lazarus Heart is an album by Randy Stonehill, released in 1994, on his own label Street Level Records.

Track listing 
All songs written by Randy Stonehill, except where noted.

 "A Promise Made Is a Promise Kept"  (Stonehill, Rick Elias) – 5:46
 "I Turn to You" (Stonehill, Cheri Keaggy) – 3:28
 "In Jesus' Name" (Stonehill, Phil Madeira) – 4:27
 "Under the Rug" (Stonehill, Dave Perkins, Terry Scott Taylor) – 3:39
 "Remember My Name"  – 4:56
 "That's Why We Don't Love God" – 5:17
 "When I'm Afraid" – 3:38
 "Shadow Man" (Stonehill, Perkins) – 3:35
 "Zurich In the Snow" – 0:19
 "Troubles" – 3:22
 "The Lazarus Heart" – 4:26

Personnel 
 Randy Stonehill – lead vocals, additional backing vocals, acoustic guitar, Chet Atkins solid body nylon-string acoustic guitar
 Rick Elias – acoustic piano, keyboards, additional backing vocals
 Phil Madeira – organ, accordion, dobro, additional backing vocals 
 Michael W. Smith – additional keyboards (3), lead vocals (3)
 Jimmie Lee Sloas – Wurlitzer electric piano, bass guitar, backing vocals (2, 3, 5, 6)
 Phil Keaggy – electric guitars, lead guitar (4)
 Jerry McPherson – electric guitars, acoustic guitar
 Mark Hill – fretless bass (10)
 Steve Brewster – drums
 Eric Darken – percussion
 Mark Douthit – soprano saxophone
 Bob Carlisle – backing vocals (1), additional backing vocals (1)
 Kim Fleming – additional backing vocals (1)
 Vicki Hampton – additional backing vocals (1)
 Christine Denté – harmony vocals (2)
 Gordon Kennedy – additional backing vocals, backing vocals (2, 3, 5, 6)
 Jerry Chamberlain – additional backing vocals
 Sharon Chamberlain – additional backing vocals
 David Robertson – additional backing vocals
 Gary Chapman – backing vocals (8)
 Riki Michele – additional backing vocals, harmony vocals (11)

Production 
 Ray Ware – executive producer 
 Jimmie Lee Sloas – producer 
 Richie Biggs – engineer, mixing (3, 6, 7, 8, 10, 11)
 Craig Hansen – mixing (1, 2, 4, 5, 9)
 Ken Love – mastering 
 Pam Kistler – production assistant 
 Chris Ross – production assistant 
 Dietsch & Associates – cover art direction, design
 Michael Scanland Communications, Inc. – design, insert layout 
 Thunder Image Group. – cover photography 
 Rick Elias – wardrobe ... "well, okay, I swiped his jacket and vest - so sue me!"
 Dominique at Trumps Studio (Nashville, TN) – make-up
 H. Benyousky, M. Scanland & G. Morkel – key grips

Studios
 Recorded at The Bennett House and Shakin' Studios (Franklin, Tennessee); The Board Room, OmniSound and The Dugout (Nashville, Tennessee); The Green Room (Huntington Beach, California).
 Mixed at The Dugout and Charlie Peacock Studios (Nashville, Tennessee).
 Mastered at MasterMix (Nashville, Tennessee).

1994 albums
Randy Stonehill albums
Albums produced by Jimmie Lee Sloas